QFX are an electronic dance music group formed in 1992. Their music style is generally a mix of bouncy techno and happy hardcore.

Career
QFX band members include Kirk Turnbull (song writer & producer), Heather Allan Finnie (vocals)Debbie Hudspeth Duncan (Stage Performer),Paul Giff(MC),  David Goonery (Dancer). The band are joined on stage by Amy Davies, Lauren Black, Jackie nicoal. Previous members include, Neil Trotter MC, Steven Lawes MC, Debbie Hudspeth (vocals), Stevie Scott (dancer from 2000 to 2002), David Walker (dancer/remixer and DJ), Barry Brown (dancer), and Brian Nelly (dancer), Natalie Estelle James (vocals), and Neil Trotter (MC)
In December 1994, they released their first album, entitled Freedom.  It reached number 5 in the UK Indie Chart. Freedom stayed on that Top 20 list for fourteen weeks. In January 1996, QFX covered the Moby track, "Everytime You Touch Me", which propelled QFX into the UK Singles Chart at number 22 and Scottish Singles Chart at number 2. This led to an appearance on BBC Television's Top of the Pops. In July 1996, the band released "You Got The Power", which reached #33 in the same UK chart. QFX also remixed songs for other musicians, including Gala with "Freed from Desirewhich reached no 2 in the uk in 1997".

QFX released Seven albums, and had 8 UK Top 40 hit singles, including a Scottish Singles Chart #1 single with "Freedom 2" in January 1997. They were featured on over 20 compilation albums worldwide..

In early 2010, they released QFX The Anthems 1995 -2010, which included all their hits, plus their remixes and featured special guest remixes, producers, and vocalists.

In 2015, QFX are still doing a Live PA, with original members Kirk Turnbull, Heather Allan Finnie, David Goonery, with their new MC Paul Giff (Joined 2018). The band are currently touring the UK, celebrating their 30th year since they formed, including headlining many music and dance festivals.

QFX launched Dance Anthems in March 2013 and have spent the last few years touring the UK with their brand new stage show. The concept of the show incorporates QFX covers of the best dance tracks in the club scene from the 1990s and early 2000s, as well as updated mixes of QFX tracks and originals. An album entitled "Dance Anthems" was released later in that year.

Albums

Singles/EPs

References

External links
 Dontstayin.com
 Bebo.com
 MySpace.com

Scottish electronic music groups
British dance music groups
British techno music groups
Hardcore techno music groups